The Mongala River in the northern Democratic Republic of the Congo is a right tributary of the Congo River.

Course

It is formed by the confluence of the Dwa River and the Ebola River in Nord-Ubangi province upstream from Businga.
It flows southwest and then south past Likimi on its right bank, then turns to flow west past Binga on its left bank and then southwest to its confluence with the right bank of the Congo River at Mobeka.
For most of its course it defines the western boundary between Mongala province and Sud-Ubangi province.
Near its mouth the last short section runs between Mongala and Équateur province.

History

The Belgian soldier Ernest Baert undertook two explorations of the Mongala River despite the hostility of the local people, who attempted to capture the steamers.
He left Bangala on 23 November 1886 and ascended the Mongala on the A.I.A. for 66 hours to the furthest point reached by his predecessors George Grenfell and Camille Coquilhat, where he found a large local population that became increasingly hostile as the expedition advanced and attacked several times.
He reached Mongandi and the Ebola–Dwa confluence on 1 December 1886, and founded a station at Moboika before returning to Bangalas.

References

Sources

Further reading

External links
Multi-temporal JERS-1 SAR Image of the Congo River in Central Africa - Satellite thermal image of the Congo River showing the Mongala River.